The 2019–20 Providence Friars men's basketball team represents Providence College in the 2019–20 NCAA Division I men's basketball season. The Friars, led by ninth-year head coach Ed Cooley, play their home games at the Dunkin' Donuts Center as members of the Big East Conference.

At the time of the cancellation of the 2020 NCAA Division I men's basketball tournament, the Friars were listed as a projected member of the tournament field by every major college basketball publication.

Previous season
The Friars finished the 2018–19 season 18–16, 7–11 in Big East play to finish in a three-way tie for last place. As the No. 8 seed in the Big East tournament, they defeated Butler before losing to Villanova in the quarterfinals. 
They received an at-large bid to the NIT as the No. 4 seed in the Indiana bracket where they lost to Arkansas in the first round.

Offseason

Departures

Incoming transfers

2019 recruiting class

Roster

Schedule and results

|-
!colspan=9 style=| Exhibition

|-
!colspan=9 style=| Non-conference regular season

|-
!colspan=9 style=| Big East regular season

|-
!colspan=9 style=| Big East tournament

Rankings

References

Providence
Providence Friars men's basketball seasons
Providence
Providence